The Ministry of Development Planning and Statistics (Arabic: وزارة التخطيط التنموي والإحصاء) is a governmental agency in the State of Qatar. It was established through an Emiri Decision No (4) in 2013.

History
On 26 June 2013, the Emir Sheikh Tamim bin Hamad Al Thani issued the Emiri Order No. 4 of 2013 forming the Cabinet. In this order, Ministry of Development Planning and Statistics has been founded and Dr. Saleh Mohamed Salem Al Nabit has been appointed as Minister of Development Planning and Statistics. It was formed as a result of a merger between the General Secretariat for Development Planning (GSDP) and Qatar Statistics Authority (QSA).

References

Government ministries of Qatar
Ministries established in 2013
2013 establishments in Qatar
Urban planning in Qatar